Loyalty Is Royalty is the fourth studio album by American rapper and Wu-Tang Clan member Masta Killa. It was released on September 29, 2017, on Nature Sounds.

Critical reception
HipHopDX wrote that Masta Killa "may not be the most animated in the Wu, but he arguably holds a place near the first spot if you want to rank the Wu champions of solo album consistency."

Track listing

References 

2017 albums
Masta Killa albums
Albums produced by 9th Wonder
Albums produced by Dame Grease
Albums produced by Illmind
Albums produced by RZA
Albums produced by True Master
Nature Sounds albums